Ronalds Zaķis (born July 8, 1987) is a Latvian professional basketball player who plays for KK Viimsi of the Latvian–Estonian Basketball League.

Career
Ronalds Zaķis started his career playing for BK Ventspils. In early 2008, he was loaned to VEF Rīga and after the season he declared for the 2008 NBA draft, however, he pulled out and ultimately was never drafted. For 2008-09 Zaķis returned to Ventspils, winning his first Latvian League championship.

On July 22, 2014, Zaķis signed a contract with VEF Rīga. With VEF he won his third Latvian championship.

On August 12, 2015, Zaķis moved to Slovenian team Union Olimpija for the 2015–16 season.

In August 2016, Zaķis returned to Ventspils.

In August 2020 he signed for the Rostock Seawolves in the German ProA League. On summer of 2021 he joined Latvian-Estonian Basketball League debutants KK Viimsi and helped them to reach the Final Four. 

On 13 July 2022, he signed a one-year contract with Dutch club Donar of the BNXT League.

International career
Zaķis was leading scorer of entire 2007 FIBA Europe Under-20 Championship with 24.7 ppg. His first appearance for Latvian national team came in 2008, he played in 10 games over his career.

References

External links
 Profile at aba-liga.com
 Profile at basket.lv
 Profile at fiba.com

1987 births
Living people
ABA League players
BK VEF Rīga players
BK Ventspils players
Centers (basketball)
Donar (basketball club) players
KK Olimpija players
Latvian men's basketball players
Power forwards (basketball)
Rostock Seawolves players